Kobylsk is a rural locality (a selo) in Kichmegnskoye Rural Settlement, Kichmengsko-Gorodetsky District, Vologda Oblast, Russia. The population was 154 as of 2002. There are 6 streets.

Geography 
Kobylsk is located 31 km northeast of Kichmengsky Gorodok (the district's administrative centre) by road. Kobylkino is the nearest rural locality.

References 

Rural localities in Kichmengsko-Gorodetsky District